Granton is a rural residential locality in the local government areas (LGA) of Derwent Valley (80%) and Glenorchy (20%) in the South-east and Hobart LGA regions of Tasmania. The 2016 census recorded a population of 1736 for the state suburb of Granton.
It is a suburb of Hobart. Rust Road is the approximate boundary between the two municipalities at Granton.

Public facilities including the Granton War Memorial Hall, public toilets and Granton Green Reserve are located within the Derwent Valley Council section.

History 
Granton was gazetted as a locality in 1970.

The locality was originally known as South Bridgewater, and is home to the Granton Convict Site, which consists of the Old Watch House (1838) and the quarry from which stone was extracted for the construction of the Bridgewater Causeway.

Geography
The waters of the River Derwent form the northern boundary.

Road infrastructure 
Route A10 (Lyell Highway) runs through from east to west.

References

Suburbs of Hobart
Glenorchy, Tasmania
Towns in Tasmania
Localities of Derwent Valley Council
Localities of City of Glenorchy